Jussi Pekka Utriainen is a Finnish long-distance runner. At the 2012 Summer Olympics, he competed in the Men's marathon, finishing in 69th place.

References

Finnish male long-distance runners
Finnish male marathon runners
People from Kuopio
Living people
Olympic athletes of Finland
Athletes (track and field) at the 2004 Summer Olympics
Athletes (track and field) at the 2012 Summer Olympics
1978 births
Sportspeople from North Savo